The following is a list of important scholarly resources related to Herbert Hoover, the 31st president of the United States. For recent work see Ellis W. Hawley (2018). For older studies see Patrick G. O’Brien and Philip T. Rosen, (1981), 25–42, 83–99 and Patrick G. O’Brien, (1988).

Secondary sources

Biographies
 Best, Gary Dean. The Politics of American Individualism: Herbert Hoover in Transition, 1918–1921 (1975)
 Best, Gary Dean. The Life of Herbert Hoover: Keeper of the Torch, 1933–1964. Palgrave Macmillan, 2013.
 
 Clements, Kendrick A. The Life of Herbert Hoover: Imperfect Visionary, 1918–1928 (2010).
 Edwards, Barry C. "Putting Hoover on the Map: Was the 31st President a Progressive?." Congress & the Presidency 41#1 (2014) pp 49–83
 
 Gelfand, Lawrence E. ed. Herbert Hoover: The Great War and Its Aftermath, 1914–1923 (1979)

 Hawley, Ellis. Herbert Hoover as Secretary of Commerce: Studies in New Era Thought and Practice (1981).
 .
 Jeansonne, Glen. The Life of Herbert Hoover: Fighting Quaker, 1928–1933. Palgrave Macmillan; 2012.
 Jeansonne, Glen. Herbert Hoover: A Life (2016), 464pp; comprehensive scholarly biography
 

 

 Lloyd, Craig. Aggressive Introvert: A Study of Herbert Hoover and Public Relations Management, 1912–1932 (1973).
 Nash, George H. "The 'Great Humanitarian': Herbert Hoover, the Relief of Belgium, and the Reconstruction of Europe after War I." The Tocqueville Review 38.2 (2017): 55–70.
 Nash, George H. "An American Epic’: Herbert Hoover and Belgian Relief in World War I." Prologue Magazine 21 (1989). online
 Nash, George H. The Life of Herbert Hoover: The Engineer 1874–1914 (1983); in-depth scholarly study online. 

 .
 . online

 Nash, Lee, ed. Understanding Herbert Hoover: Ten Perspectives (1987); essays by scholars
  Book 1 in The Life of Herbert Hoover Series.
 
 Smith, Gene. The Shattered Dream: Herbert Hoover and the Great Depression (1970)
 Smith, Richard Norton. An Uncommon Man: The Triumph of Herbert Hoover, (1987), biography concentrating on post 1932.
 Walch, Timothy. ed. Uncommon Americans: The Lives and Legacies of Herbert and Lou Henry Hoover Praeger, 2003.
 West, Hal Elliott. Hoover, The Fishing President: Portrait of the Man and his Life Outdoors (2005).
 Whyte, Kenneth. Hoover: An Extraordinary Life in Extraordinary Time (2017). 752pp  excerpt

Scholarly studies

 Accinelli, Robert D. "The Hoover Administration and the World Court." Peace & Change 4.3 (1977): 28–36.
 Banholzer, Simon, and Tobias Straumann. "Why the French Said 'Non': A New Perspective on the Hoover Moratorium of June 1931." Journal of Contemporary History 56.4 (2021): 1040–1060. doi:10.1177/0022009420949924

 Barber, William J. From New Era to New Deal: Herbert Hoover, the Economists, and American Economic Policy, 1921–1933. (1985)
 Barry, John M. Rising Tide: The Great Mississippi Flood of 1927 and How It Changed America (1998), Hoover played a major role
 Brandes, Joseph. Herbert Hoover and economic diplomacy; Department of Commerce policy 1921-1928 (1962) online borrow

 Britten, Thomas A. "Hoover and the Indians: the Case for Continuity in Federal Indian Policy, 1900–1933" Historian 1999 61(3): 518–538. 
 Cabanes, Bruno. "The hungry and the sick: Herbert Hoover, the Russian famine, and the professionalization of humanitarian aid" in Bruno Cabanes, The Great War and the Origins of Humanitarianism, 1918-1924 (Cambridge UP, 2014) 189–247. 
 Calder, James D. The Origins and Development of Federal Crime Control Policy: Herbert Hoover's Initiatives Praeger, 1993
 
 Chapman, Michael E. "Ironies of Character: Hoover's Foreign Policy with Asia." in A Companion to Warren G. Harding, Calvin Coolidge, and Herbert Hoover (2014): 502–521.
 Clements, Kendrick A. Hoover, Conservation, and Consumerism: Engineering the Good Life. University Press of Kansas, 2000

 Current, Richard N. "The Stimson Doctrine and the Hoover Doctrine." American Historical Review 59.3 (1954): 513–542. online
 DeConde, Alexander. Herbert Hoover's Latin-American policy (1951) online

 
 Druelle, Clotilde.  Feeding Occupied France during World War I: Herbert Hoover and the Blockade (2019) 

 
 Ellis, L. Ethan. Republican Foreign Policy, 1921-1933 (1968) online
 Fausold, Martin L. The Presidency of Herbert C. Hoover (UP of Kansas, 1985), aa major scholarly survey online

 
 Gelfand, Lawrence E. ed. Herbert Hoover--the Great War and Its Aftermath, 1914-23 (U of Iowa Press, 1979). Eight essays by scholars. online
 George Jr, James H. "Another Chance: Herbert Hoover and World War II Relief." Diplomatic History 16.3 (1992): 389–407. online

 
 Hamilton, David E. From New Day to New Deal: American Farm Policy from Hoover to Roosevelt, 1928–1933. (1991)
 
 Hatfield, Mark, ed. Herbert Hoover Reassessed: Essays Commemorating the Fiftieth Anniversary of the Inauguration of Our Thirty-First President (US Government Printing Office,  1981).  online free, major collection of 29 essays by scholars

 
 
 
 Jeansonne, Glen S. "Hoover goes to Belgium." History Today (Jan 2015) 65#1 pp 19–24. online; popular history

 

 Kennedy, Greg. "Depression and security: Aspects influencing the United States Navy during the Hoover administration." 
 Koyoma, Kumiko. 2009. “The Passage of the Smoot-Hawley Tariff Act: Why Did the President Sign the Bill?” Journal of Policy History 21 (2): 163-86
 Kubo, Fumiaki, Ryūji Hattori, and Satoshi Hattori. "The 1930s: Japan’s War with China and American Non-Recognition." in The History of US-Japan Relations (Palgrave Macmillan, Singapore, 2017). 83–102. online

 Lichtman, Allan J. Prejudice and the Old Politics: The Presidential Election of 1928 (1979)
 Lisio, Donald J. The President and Protest: Hoover, MacArthur, and the Bonus Riot, 2d ed. (1994)
 Lisio, Donald J. Hoover, Blacks, and Lily-whites: A Study of Southern Strategies (1985)
 Lochner, Louis P. Herbert Hoover and Germany (1960) online

 McKercher, B. J. C. "'A Certain Irritation': The White House, the State Department, and the Desire for a Naval Settlement with Great Britain, 1927–1930." Diplomatic History 31.5 (2007): 829–863. online
 McPherson, Alan. "Herbert Hoover, Occupation Withdrawal, and the Good Neighbor Policy." Presidential Studies Quarterly  44.4 (2014): 623–639 online

 Malin, James C. The United States after the World War. 1930. extensive coverage of Hoover's Commerce Dept. policies
 Morison, Elting E. Turmoil and Tradition: A Study of the Life and Times of Henry L. Stimson (1960), scholarly biography online
 Myers, William Starr; Walter H. Newton, eds. The Hoover Administration; a documented narrative (1936) pp 577–618.online many documents included in the narrative.
 Nash, Lee, ed. Understanding Herbert Hoover: Ten Perspectives (1987); essays by scholars on various topics. online
 Nash, Lee, ed. Herbert Hoover and World Peace (2010) 
 Olson, James S. Herbert Hoover and the Reconstruction Finance Corporation, 1931–1933 (1977)
 Parafianowicz, Halina. "Hoover's Moratorium and Some Aspects of American Policy Towards Eastern and Central Europe in 1931," American Studies. (1987) 6#1 pp 63–84.

 Robinson, Edgar Eugene and Vaughn Davis Bornet. Herbert Hoover: President of the United States. (1976)
 Romasco, Albert U. The Poverty of Abundance: Hoover, the Nation, the Depression (1965)
 Schwarz, Jordan A. The Interregnum of Despair: Hoover, Congress, and the Depression. (1970). Hostile to Hoover
 Sibley, Katherine A.S., ed. A Companion to Warren G. Harding, Calvin Coolidge, and Herbert Hoover (2014); 616pp; essays by scholars stressing historiography
 Stoff, Michael B. "Herbert Hoover: 1929–1933". The American Presidency: The Authoritative Reference. New York, New York: Houghton Mifflin Company (2004), 332–343
 Sobel, Robert Herbert Hoover and the Onset of the Great Depression 1929–1930 (1975)

 Walker III, William O. "Crucible for peace: Herbert Hoover, modernization, and economic growth in Latin America." Diplomatic History 30.1 (2006): 83–117. online jstor
 Weissman, Benjamin M. Herbert Hoover and famine relief to Soviet Russia, 1921–1923 (Hoover Institution Press, 1974).
 Wilbur, Ray Lyman, and Arthur Mastick Hyde. The Hoover Policies. (1937). In depth description of his administration by two cabinet members
 Wilson, John R. M. “Herbert Hoover’s Military Policy.” in Herbert Hoover and World Peace, ed. Lee Nash. (2010) pp 115–32.
 Wilson, John R. M.  “The Quaker and the Sword: Herbert Hoover’s Relations with the Military.” Military Affairs 38#2 (1974), pp. 41–47, online.
 Wueschner, Silvano A. Charting Twentieth-Century Monetary Policy: Herbert Hoover and Benjamin Strong, 1917–1927. Greenwood, 1999

Historiography
 Extensive annotated bibliography at the University of Virginia Miller Center of Public Affairs
 

 Braeman, John. "Power and Diplomacy: the 1920's Reappraised." The Review of Politics 44.3 (1982): 342–369.

 Dodge, Mark M., ed. Herbert Hoover and the Historians. (1989)
 Hawley, Ellis."Herbert Hoover and the Historians—Recent Developments: A Review Essay" Annals of Iowa 78#1 (2018) p. 75-86 https://doi.org/10.17077/0003-4827.12547

 O'Brien, Patrick G. “Hoover and Historians: Revisionism Since 1980,” Annals of Iowa  49#5 (1988), 394–402. online
 
 Tracey, Kathleen. Herbert Hoover–A Bibliography: His Writings and Addresses. (1977)

Primary sources

Works by Hoover

 Principles of Mining (1909)
 Food Guide for War Service at Home Prepared under the direction of the United States Food Administration (1918)
 Preface to a report of the United States Food Administration (1920)
 American Individualism (1922)
 .
 American Ideals Versus the New Deal (1936)
 .
 .
 .
 Hoover, Herbert. Prefaces to Peace (1943)
 .
 .
 .
 .
 Hoover, Herbert. The Ordeal of Woodrow Wilson (1958)
 Hoover, Herbert. Herbert Hoover On Growing Up: His Letters from and to American Children (1962)
 Hoover, Herbert. Fishing for Fun: And to Wash Your Soul (1963)
 Hawley, Ellis, ed. Herbert Hoover: Containing the Public Messages, Speeches, and Statements of the President, 4 vols. (1974–1977)
 .
 .

Other primary sources
 Myers, William Starr; Walter H. Newton, eds. The Hoover Administration; a documented narrative. 1936.

 
 
 American Engineering Council, Committee on Elimination of Waste in Industry; Waste in Industry Federated American Engineering Societies, 1921
 Rogers, Benjamin F. “‘Dear Mr. President’: The Hoover-Truman Correspondence.” Presidential Studies Quarterly 16#3  (1986), pp. 503–10, online
 Stimson, Henry and McGeorge Bundy, On Active Service in Peace and War. (1948) (memoirs) online

Hoover, Herbert
Hoover, Herbert
Hoover, Herbert
Hoover, Herbert
Hoover, Herbert